Carmin Tropical is a 2014 Mexican drama film directed by Rigoberto Pérezcano. The film was named on the shortlist for Mexico's entry for the Academy Award for Best Foreign Language Film at the 89th Academy Awards, but it was not selected.

Plot 
Mabel, a muxe who lives in Veracruz, returns to her hometown in Oaxaca to find the murderer of her friend Daniela. During her trip she meets Modesto, a cab driver who reminds her of the time when she was one of the most recognized cabaret singers in the community, which she gave up to go in search of a man's love.

Cast
 José Pecina as Mabel
 Luis Alberti as Modesto
 Everardo Trejo as Faraón Morales
 Juan Carlos Medellin as Darina

References

External links
 

2014 films
2014 drama films
Mexican drama films
2010s Spanish-language films
2010s Mexican films